Harless Creek is a stream in the U.S. states of Kansas and Missouri.

Harless Creek was named after the local Harless family.

See also
List of rivers of Kansas
List of rivers of Missouri

References

Rivers of Miami County, Kansas
Rivers of Cass County, Missouri
Rivers of Kansas
Rivers of Missouri